The hat-trick is a classic magic trick where a performer will produce an object (traditionally a rabbit or a bouquet of flowers) out of an apparently empty top hat.

Method 

In its simplest form, the trick works by placing the hat on a specially made table or chest. Both the hat, and the surface it is placed on, will have a hidden opening in them, through which an object stored in a compartment in the table or chest can be pulled. Alternatively, the performer can produce an item hidden in their sleeve using sleight of hand and misdirection.  This eliminates the need to place the hat on a surface, and also allows the performer to give the hat to an audience member for inspection. However, producing a rabbit from a hat using nothing but sleight of hand is a much more difficult trick.

This trick is also traditionally performed for children, since it is a basic trick with basic props.

It is said that the earliest magician to pull a rabbit out of a hat was Louis Comte, in 1814, though this is also attributed to the much later John Henry Anderson.

Pop culture 

This magic trick is so well known that it has been referenced in a wide variety of media.  The top hat used for the trick has become almost synonymous with stage magicians, and is commonly used as an icon to represent magic (such as the example on the right). Likewise, rabbits are so commonly associated with the trick that rabbits are often used to represent magic in general.

See also

 Black box
 Bizarre magic
 Card magic
 Card throwing
 Cardistry
 Children's magic
 Coin magic
 Escape magic
 Flourish
 Gospel Magic
 Illusionist
 List of magic tricks
 Magic Castle
 Mental magic
 Sleight of hand
 Street magic
 Platform magic
 Terms
 Trick deck
 Tarbell Course
 The Magic Circle
 Timeline
 Theatrical Séances

References 

Magic tricks
Hats